At the end of 2015 the wind power in Bulgaria had production capacity of 691MW
.
That capacity generated 1,436 GWh for 2015
which represented 3.23% 
of the whole power generated in the country for that period. 
The capacity factor for wind power in Bulgaria in 2015 was about 23.7%. We can get to this number knowing that at the end of 2015 the wind power capacity was 0.6912GW and during 2015 there was no new wind capacity installed.

Installed capacity growth
The table shows an annual increase in installed wind power capacity.

List of the wind farms in Bulgaria
This is the list of wind farms in Bulgaria at the end of 2015

See also

Solar power in Bulgaria
Hydroelectricity in Bulgaria
European Wind Energy Association
Global Wind Energy Council
Wind power in the European Union
Renewable energy by country

References